CKTF-FM (104.1 MHz) is a French-language Canadian radio station located in Gatineau, Quebec, and broadcasting to the National Capital Region including Ottawa. It is owned by Bell Media and is part of the "Énergie" network, airing a mainstream rock format. Its radio studios and offices are at 215 Boulevard Saint-Joseph.

CKTF-FM has an effective radiated power (ERP) of 19,000 watts as a class C1 FM station. It uses an omnidirectional antenna located in Camp Fortune, in Gatineau Park.

History

After receiving CRTC approval in 1987, it started operations on March 11, 1989 as a sister station to CJRC 104.7 (now owned by Cogeco since February 2011).

References

External links
 Énergie 104.1
 

Ktf
Ktf
Ktf
Ktf
Radio stations established in 1989
1989 establishments in Quebec